Always Never Enough is the fifth studio album by Australian country music singer Catherine Britt. The album was released in August 2012 and peaked at number 44 on the ARIA Charts. The album was supported by a national tour across June and July 2012.

At the ARIA Music Awards of 2012, the album was nominated for the ARIA Award for Best Country Album.

At the AIR Awards of 2013, the album won Best Independent Country Album.

Background and release
Since the release of her last self titled album in 2010, Britt won numerous awards for songwriting; including "Sweet Emmylou" which won 'Single of the Year' at the 2011 Country Music Awards of Australia. The song came in second place in the 2011 Vanda & Young Songwriting Competition, behind Kimbra, who took home first prize for "Cameo Lover". "Sweet Emmylou" also placed second in the Americana category in the 2011 International Songwriting Competition, which had over 16,000 entries from 112 countries.

In 2012, Britt performed over the weekend at Song Summit's Women of Vanda and Young showcase along with Megan Washington and hosts the national TV show 'Alt Country' on the Country Music Channel. Britt also toured with Beccy Cole, co-headlined at CMC Rocks the Hunter and co-hosted the 7th Australian Music Prize Awards.

Always Never Enough was recorded in Austin, Texas and features include Grammy Award-winning producer and musician Lloyd Maines, Carrie Rodriguez, Lucinda Williams, Gurf Morlix, Jimmy LaFave, Eliza Gilkyson, Carrie Rodriguez, Bobby Kallus, Glenn Schuetz, Phil Hurley, John Silva, Chip Dolan, Ray Bonneville and John Blundell. The album was announced in May 2012 with the album's lead single, "Always Never Enough", released on 4 June.

Track listing

Charts

Weekly charts

Year-end charts

Release history

References

2012 albums
Catherine Britt albums